RoboWar is an open-source video game in which the player programs onscreen icon-like robots to battle each other with animation and sound effects. The syntax of the language in which the robots are programmed is a relatively simple stack-based one, based largely on IF, THEN, and simply-defined variables.

25 RoboWar tournaments were held in the past between 1990 until roughly 2003, when tournaments became intermittent and many of the major coders moved on.  All robots from all tournaments are available on the RoboWar website.

The RoboWar programming language, RoboTalk, is a stack-oriented programming language and is similar in structure to FORTH.

Programming features
RoboWar for the Macintosh was notable among the genre of autonomous robot programming games for the powerful programming model it exposed to the gamer. By the early 1990s, RoboWar included an integrated debugger that permitted stepping through code and setting breakpoints. Later editions of the RoboTalk language used by the robots (a cognate of the HyperTalk language for Apple's HyperCard) included support for interrupts as well.

History
RoboWar was originally released as a closed source shareware game in 1990 by David Harris for the Apple Macintosh platform. The source code has since been released and implementations are now also available for Microsoft Windows.  It was based upon the same concepts as the 1981 Apple II game RobotWar.

Initially tournaments were run by David Harris himself, but were eventually run by Eric Foley.

See also

Core War
RobotWar
Crobots
Robot Battle

References

External links

 RoboWar 5 - Home of the recent Microsoft Windows version and original Macintosh version
 RoboWar project page at SourceForge.net
 RoboWarX - An implementation written in C#
  JSRoboWar - Runs in a HTML5-compatible web browser
 RoboWar on the Programming Games Wiki

Classic Mac OS games
Open-source video games
Programming games
Windows games
Artificial life models
Programming contests
1990 video games
Video games about robots
Video games developed in the United States
Commercial video games with freely available source code